Tyron Leitso (born January 7, 1976) is a Canadian actor.

Advertising 
Leitso has also appeared in commercial campaigns for "Salon Selectives", "Haggar Slacks", "The Florida Board of Health", "GTS Communications" (in Europe only), and "B.C. Tel/Telus", amongst others.

Filmography

References

External links 
 

1976 births
Living people
Canadian male film actors
Canadian male television actors
Male actors from British Columbia
People from North Vancouver